Todas as Flores (English title: All the Flowers) is a Brazilian telenovela created by João Emanuel Carneiro. It premiered on Globoplay on 19 October 2022. The telenovela stars Sophie Charlotte, Regina Casé, Letícia Colin, and Mariana Nunes.

Plot 
Maíra (Sophie Charlotte) lives in the city of Pirenópolis, in Goiás, with her father, Ivaldo (Chico Díaz). Maíra, who is blind, grew up believing that her mother was dead, a lie that her father made up to protect her because Maíra's mother rejected her at birth because of her visual impairment. One day, Maíra witnesses her father arguing with Zoé (Regina Casé), her mother, who's reappearance has a reason. During the argument, Ivaldo has a heart attack and dies. Zoé, who has a criminal history, tells Maíra a different version of why she disappeared, that Ivaldo ran away with her when she was still a little girl, preventing the two from having a relationship.

Without anyone, Maíra accepts her mother's proposal to move to Rio de Janeiro with her. When Maíra arrives in the city, she meets her sister, Vanessa (Letícia Colin), who needs a bone marrow transplant to treat leukemia. Zoé explains the situation to Maíra, and she offers herself for Vanessa's procedure. In Rio, Maíra is reunited with Judite (Mariana Nunes), her godmother, who warns her about how dangerous Zoé can be. The relationship between Maíra and Vanessa becomes more complicated because of Rafael (Humberto Carrão), Vanessa's fiancé who falls in love with Maíra, and Pablo (Caio Castro), Vanessa's lover and partner in her scams.

Cast 
 Sophie Charlotte as Maíra Cruz
 Regina Casé as Zoé da Cruz
 Letícia Colin as Vanessa Cruz 
 Mariana Nunes as Judite Mourão
 Humberto Carrão as Rafael Albuquerque
 Caio Castro as Pablo Xavier
 Nicolas Prattes as Diego da Silva
 Cássio Gabus Mendes as Luís Felipe Kreusinger
 Naruna Costa as Lila Kreusinger
 Ângelo Antônio as Samsa Mondego
 Bárbara Reis as Débora Mondego
 Douglas Silva as Oberdan Nascimento
 Mary Sheila as Jussara Nascimento
 Luís Navarro as Mark
 Leonardo Lima Carvalho as Celinho Nascimento
 Suzy Rêgo as Patsy Martínez
 Zezeh Barbosa as Darcy Munhoz
 Micheli Machado as Chininha Munhoz
 Jhona Burjack as Javé 
 Yara Charry as Joy Kreusinger
 André Loddi as Olavo Kreusinger
 Duda Batsow as Jéssica da Silva 
 Samantha Jones as Ciça
 Adriana Seiffert as Garcia
 Mumuzinho as José Carlos Nonato "Joca"
 Xande de Pilares as Darci
 Heloisa Honein as Brenda Munhoz
 Camila Alves as Gabriela
 Moira Braga as Fafá
 Cleber Tolini as Márcio
 Amanda Mittz as Laura
 Luiz Fortes as Rominho
 Rodrigo Vidal as Biel da Silva
 Kelzy Ecard as Deca da Silva "Dequinha"
 Jackson Antunes as Galo
 Fábio Assunção as Humberto Albuquerque
 Thalita Carauta as Mauritânia Munhoz
 Gabriel Lima as Xande
 Bernardo Gomes as Guga
 Pietro Cheuen as Gui
 Giovana Pedrosa as Tina

Guest stars 
 Valentina Bandeira as Dira
 Nilton Bicudo as Raulzito Martínez
 Chico Díaz as Rivaldo
 Ana Beatriz Nogueira as Guiomar Martínez
 Bruno Ibañez as Mendonça
 Gabriel Cardoso as Léo
 Henry Dutra as Nado
 André Pimentel as Deputy
 Murilo Sampaio as Dr. Fred
 Henrique Fraga as Thomás

Production

Development 
In 2019, the series was approved by TV Globo, with the working title being Olho por Olho, and initially scheduled to replace Um Lugar ao Sol  in the 9pm time-slot. Due to constant delays caused by the health crisis of COVID-19, the director of dramaturgy at the network underwent a change, but the soap opera was still scheduled to premiere on broadcast TV in the second half of 2022, replacing Pantanal. In March 2022, it was announced that the telenovela would premiere on Globo's streaming service Globoplay, with a reduction from 179 to 85 episodes. On 30 May 2022, Todas as Flores was announced as the official title of the telenovela. Filming began in July 2022.

Release 
The telenovela premiered on 19 October 2022. The first season will consist of 45 episodes, with 5 episodes being released weekly until 16 December 2022, and 40 episodes being released weekly from April to June 2023.

References

External links 
 

TV Globo telenovelas
Globoplay original programming
Brazilian telenovelas
Portuguese-language telenovelas
Brazilian drama television series
2020s Brazilian television series
2022 Brazilian television series debuts
2022 telenovelas